Antonín Charvát (9 October 1899 – 19 September 1930) was a Czech cyclist. He competed for Czechoslovakia in two events at the 1924 Summer Olympics.

References

External links
 
 

1899 births
1930 deaths
People from Rakovník
People from the Kingdom of Bohemia
Czech male cyclists
Olympic cyclists of Czechoslovakia
Cyclists at the 1924 Summer Olympics
Sportspeople from the Central Bohemian Region